Trinity is a station in the Purple Line of the Namma Metro in Bangalore, India. It was opened to the public on 20 October 2011. The station was constructed by Punj Lloyd.

History
 
On 9 July 2014, the Bangalore Metro Rail Corporation Ltd (BMRCL) issued a tender for co-branding the station with a large corporation. The winning company will be given signage and a kiosk in the station, and their name will become part of the station name, and announced when the stop is called on board the trains.

Station Structure

Basement
The BMRCL constructed a 4,000 sq ft area basement at the station in early 2016. The agency initially planned to use the space for storage, but later decided to rent it out for use by cultural groups. Initially, music jams occurred in basement, but it was more suited for theatre. The basement has eighteen lights installed, and the floor is painted to form a stage. The space can be rented out by obtaining permission from the metro office at MG Road.

Station layout

Entry/Exits

See also
Bangalore
List of Namma Metro stations
Transport in Karnataka
List of metro systems
List of rapid transit systems in India
Bangalore Metropolitan Transport Corporation

References

External links

 Bangalore Metro Rail Corporation Ltd. (Official site) 
 UrbanRail.Net – descriptions of all metro systems in the world, each with a schematic map showing all stations.

Namma Metro stations
Railway stations opened in 2011
2011 establishments in Karnataka
Railway stations in Bangalore